Sturgeon River is a  river in Baraga County and  Houghton counties in the U.S. state of Michigan.   of the river were added to the National Wild and Scenic Rivers System in 1992.

Description
The Sturgeon River rises on the glacially-eroded plateau that forms much of southern Baraga County. Flowing westward through the Copper Country State Forest, it enters the Ottawa National Forest north of Watton. On this stretch, which crosses and recrosses the border between Baraga County and Houghton County, the river helps to form the Sturgeon River Gorge Wilderness and flows over Sturgeon Falls.

After leaving the Ottawa National Forest west of Baraga, Sturgeon River flows northward, again crossing and recrossing the Baraga–Houghton County line. It then is dammed up to create the  Prickett Lake. Flowing from there, it moves generally parallel to the western shore of Keweenaw Bay. The river discharges into Portage Lake near Chassell, Michigan.

The Wild and Scenic portion of the Sturgeon River, within the Ottawa National Forest, is classified as a Blue Ribbon Trout Stream.

References

Rivers of Baraga County, Michigan
Rivers of Houghton County, Michigan
Rivers of Michigan
Tributaries of Lake Superior
Wild and Scenic Rivers of the United States
Ottawa National Forest